Ida Bridgeman, Countess of Bradford (née Lady Ida Frances Annabella Lumley, 28 November 1848 – 22 August 1936), was a British noblewoman who served as a Lady of the Bedchamber for Mary of Teck. She was the wife of George Bridgeman, 4th Earl of Bradford, and the mother of Orlando Bridgeman, 5th Earl of Bradford.

Lady Ida was born at Tickhill Castle, the daughter of Richard Lumley, 9th Earl of Scarbrough, and his wife, the former Frederica Mary Adeliza Drummond. She married the George Bridgeman, then Viscount Newport, on 7 September 1869 at Maltby, Yorkshire. Their children were:

 Lady Beatrice Adine Bridgeman (1870–1952), who married Colonel Rt. Hon. Ernest George Pretyman and had children.
 Lady Margaret Alice Bridgeman (1872–1954), who married John Montagu-Douglas-Scott, 7th Duke of Buccleuch, and had children, including Princess Alice, Duchess of Gloucester.
 Orlando Bridgeman, 5th Earl of Bradford (1873–1957).
 Lady Helena Mary Bridgeman (1875–1947), who married Osbert Molyneux, 6th Earl of Sefton, and had children.
 Lady Florence Sibell Bridgeman (1877–1936), who married Ronald Collet Norman and had children.
 Commander The Hon. Richard Orlando Beaconsfield Bridgeman (1879–1917), who was killed in a flying accident in East Africa during the First World War.
 Lieutenant-Colonel The Hon. Henry George Orlando Bridgeman (1882–1972), who married Joan Constable-Maxwell and had children.

The countess, then Viscountess Newport, became namesake of Lady Ida's Well close to the Weir Brook the north of the village of Kinnerley, Shropshire. It is a natural water spring that she discovered in 1895 and championed its health benefits. 

The countess was a Lady of the Bedchamber to Mary of Teck when Princess of Wales in 1901–1902.

After the death of her husband in 1915, she became known as Dowager Countess of Bradford. She remained resident at the family home of Castle Bromwich Hall until her death, following which the house was rented out. She is buried with her husband at St Andrew's Church, Weston-under-Lizard, near the family seat of Weston Park.

Arms

References

1848 births
1936 deaths
Daughters of British earls
British countesses
Ladies of the Bedchamber
People from Tickhill